De La Salle Araneta University, also referred to by its acronym (Araneta U or DLSAU), is a private Catholic Lasallian co-educational basic and higher education institution supervised by the Philippine District of the De La Salle Christian Brothers in Malabon, Metro Manila, Philippines. It was established in 1946 in Bulacan and named Araneta Institute of Agriculture.  It was then transferred to the city of Malabon the year after. In 1978 it was renamed the Gregorio Araneta University Foundation. Integration of the university with the DLS System started in 1987 until 2002 when it officially became a member of the system. It is the fifth university in the De La Salle schools network. The university specializes in Veterinary Medicine and Agricultural Sciences. It is a member of De La Salle Philippines, a network of several Lasallian educational institutions within the Lasallian East Asia District.

Historical background

The university started as the Araneta Institute of Agriculture (AIA), an agricultural school at Hacarin Dairy Farm in Hacienda Carmelita, San Jose del Monte, Bulacan. On November 24, 1947, AIA transferred to Victoneta Park, Malabon, Rizal to bring the school closer to the populace.

AIA initially started a two-year course, the Associate in Agriculture and Certificate of Proficiency in Vocational Education with only 35 students. Thereafter, the offering of other related academic programs in agriculture commenced.

In recognition of its contributions in the fields of agricultural education, research, and extension services, it was transformed into a university on January 15, 1958. Nine years later, it was converted into a foundation, the first university to be organized under Republic Act No.6055 concerning the conversion of educational institutions, and became known as the Araneta University Foundation. By virtue of a resolution approved by the board of trustees in 1978, the university was renamed the Gregorio Araneta University Foundation''.

As the curricular programs changed and the student population increased, different institutes of learning and disciplines were created. In 1991, the different institutes became "colleges." Preliminary talks and discussions on the integration of GAUF into the De La Salle University System started as early as 1987. On February 20, 2002, the Board of Trustees approved with the consent of the Araneta family, the integration of GAUF into the DLSU System, making it the seventh member of the system, becoming the De La Salle-Araneta University'''.

De La Salle Araneta University is a Roman Catholic educational institution supervised by the Christian Brothers and inspired by Saint Jean-Baptiste de La Salle. The DLSAU is a member school of a 350-year-old international, worldwide network of 1,500 Lasallian educational institutions with 70 universities and colleges in 82 countries. The DLSAU focuses on educational programs in agriculture, forestry, and veterinary medicine. It also has a basic education department (elementary school and high school) a college and a graduate school department. The Basic Education Department is an academic preparatory department for college. The College Department offers programs in veterinary medicine, agriculture, forestry, business, HRM and travel tourism management, accountancy, psychology, computer science and education while the graduate school confers the following master's degrees: Master of Arts in education, and Master in management. The university also offers doctoral degree programs in philosophy.

In June 2011, the De La Salle Agrivet Sciences Institute, located in Bulacan, was established under the leadership of Br. Narciso S. Erguiza Jr. FSC. It is a satellite campus of De La Salle Araneta University in Malabon. Its purpose is to be a demonstration site for the university's and DLSP's food, and agriculture science-related programs.

De La Salle Araneta University has several varsity teams competing in various sports activities such as Basketball, Football, Volleyball, Athletics, Badminton, Swimming, Table tennis, and Taekwondo.

Notable alumni
 Sharmaine Arnaiz, 2007

References

External links
 De La Salle Araneta University

Araneta
Catholic universities and colleges in Metro Manila
Education in Malabon
Educational institutions established in 1946
1946 establishments in the Philippines